The Buffalo Sharks were a professional basketball team in the American Basketball Association based in Buffalo, New York. The team played two seasons as the Buffalo Rapids and Buffalo Silverbacks before suspending operations. This team is not to be confused with the Buffalo Stampede of the Premier Basketball League.

History

Buffalo Rapids (2005–06)
The Buffalo Rapids were founded by Gary Nice and began play in the fall of 2005 as part of the ABA's Connie Hawkins Division. It was the first professional basketball team to play in Buffalo, New York since the Buffalo Braves. The team's name was chosen by a fan voting, with "Rapids" finishing second to "Braves". Trademark restrictions prevented the franchise from adopting the Braves name, but the Rapids team colors were identical to those of the Buffalo Braves.

Dan Robbie and Todd Wier became co-owners of the franchise in December 2005 following the league's removal of Gary Nice.

Initial games were played at Burt Flickinger Center, but a financial dispute left the team searching for a new permanent home. They played most home games at Park School of Buffalo until February 2006. The final home game of the 2005–2006 season was played at Buffalo State Sports Arena, with the team later utilizing the venue for most 2006–2007 home games.

Buffalo Silverbacks (2006–07)

It was announced in May 2006 that the franchise had changed its name to the Buffalo Silverbacks. Controversy arose in August 2006 when the Buffalo News ran an article condemning the team's logo, which featured a silverback gorilla, as racist. The team responded by adopting a new team logo featuring a tiger in October 2006.

Another bit of controversy involved the Silverbacks announcing that DayShawn Wright had been signed to the team in September 2006. Soon after this announcement, Wright signed with the Minot SkyRockets of the CBA.

Head coach Richard Jacob resigned from the team in November 2006 to focus on his job at Medaille College. Trevor Ruffin, a player from the team's inaugural season and an assistant coach during their 2006–07 training camp, replaced him as head coach.

In 2007, Weir sold the team to Vincent Lesh. Lesh has been an entertainment promoter in Western New York for 25 years and is the owner of Concerts Plus.  On November 11, 2007, the Silverbacks announced that they were suspending operations. On their official MySpace page, the team stated "If you did not already know, the Silverbacks are not playing this fall in the ABA.  New ownership has decided to take this season off after taking over the team with 5 weeks before tip off."

Buffalo Sharks (2008)
Lesh re-branded the team as the Buffalo Sharks and reactivated them to begin play in November 2008. Richard Jacob was named the Head Coach and General Manager as he was for both the Rapids and Silverbacks.  The Sharks were to play at Koessler Athletic Center on the campus of Canisius College.  However, on 2008-09-18, Lesh announced his folding of the Sharks, his leaving of the ABA, and his purchase of the former Buffalo Dragons.

The ABA would later return to Buffalo with the Buffalo 716ers, set to begin play in 2013; that team has since moved to the Premier Basketball League.

The ABA would again return to Buffalo with the Buffalo Blue Hawks, who began play in 2016.

Standings

Game results

2005–2006

2006–2007

Roster and staff

2005–2006

Team Captain – Tim Winn
All-Star Selection – Tim Winn
All-ABA Selection – Tim Winn

Released

Staff

Owners – Gary Nice (11/05 – 12/05), Dan Robbie and Todd Wier (12/05 – 11/07)
General Manager – Richard Jacob
Head Coach – Richard Jacob
Assistant Coach – Tyrone Thomas
Player Assistant Coaches – Modie Cox and Tim Winn
Strength and Conditioning Coach – Bob Bateson
Account Executive – Bryan Perry
Game Day Operation Manager – Timothy M. Simko
Media Relations – Nadia Fezzani

2006–2007

All-Star Selection – Antoine Sims
ABA Community Service Award – Modie Cox

Released

Staff

Owners – Dan Robbie and Todd Wier
Head Coach – Trevor Ruffin
Player Assistant Coach – Modie Cox
Strength and Conditioning Coach – Bob Bateson

References

Defunct American Basketball Association (2000–present) teams
Sports in Buffalo, New York
2005 establishments in New York (state)
2008 disestablishments in New York (state)